Vitalina "Vita" Nel (born 11 December 1975) is a South African olympic beach volleyballer who competed at the 2008 Summer Olympics. She was partnered with Judith Augoustides.

References

External links
 
 
 
 

1975 births
South African beach volleyball players
Beach volleyball players at the 2008 Summer Olympics
Olympic beach volleyball players of South Africa
Living people